El amor brujo ("Love The Magician") is the last novel by Argentinian writer Roberto Arlt, published in 1932. It tells the story of an affair between a married man called Balder and a music student called Irene in Buenos Aires, shortly before the 1930 Argentine coup d'état. It is dedicated to Arlt's wife.

Style 
El amor brujo has been described as "strongly political and nihilistic: intimate relationships are portrayed as being largely fantasy or lie".

Reception 
The novel was not well received critically or popularly, and is the least-known of Arlt's four novels.

References

Works 
 
 
 

Spanish-language novels
1932 Argentine novels